The Keck-Gottschalk-Keck Apartments comprise a 1931 International Style three-flat in Chicago, Illinois. They were designed by George and William Keck and served as residences for the architects and for University of Chicago professor Louis Gottschalk.  The apartments received Chicago Landmark status on August 3, 1994.

Notes

Residential buildings completed in 1937
Buildings and structures in Chicago
Chicago Landmarks
Apartment buildings in Chicago